Nikola Lakčević (born 28 October 1999) is a Serbian footballer who plays as a winger for FK Partizan in the Serbian SuperLiga.

Career

FK Partizan 
Lakčević moved to the club in 2017, but had to endure several years on loan before getting his chance in the first team. He made his league debut for the club on 18 August 2019, coming on as a 62nd minute substitute for Aleksandar Lutovac in a 3–0 home victory over FK Rad.

References

External links 
 

1999 births
Living people
Footballers from Belgrade
OFK Beograd players
FK Teleoptik players
FK Partizan players
Serbian SuperLiga players
Serbian footballers
Association football midfielders